Simon Evans (born 12 November 1990) is a racing driver from New Zealand and is the Champion of the 2019-2020 Jaguar I-Pace eTrophy season having driven for Team Asia New Zealand. He is the brother of Formula E racer Mitch Evans.

Career

In 2012, the all-new V8SuperTourer category was launched and Evans secured an endurance drive with Kayne Scott for Farmer Racing Services. The pair achieved a podium at the Pukekohe 500. In 2013, Evans took over Scott's entry and raced the full season. Evans would finish 16th overall, with only a single podium over the season. In 2014, Evans claimed seven podium finishes and finished runner up behind four-time Bathurst 1000 winner, Greg Murphy. Evans would then win what would prove to be the final season for the V8SuperTourer category. Achieving nine wins from twelve races, it was a dominant display, and an eventual precursor for the NZ Touring Car Championship.

Following this season, Evans signed with Super Black Racing to contend the V8 Supercar Dunlop Series for 2015. Whilst Evans achieved modest results in his first full-time season overseas, it wasn't enough to secure him a drive for the following season. Other international campaigns included a guest drive in the Audi Sport TT Cup event at the Nürburgring in 2016, as well as a full-season stint in the Chinese-based FRD LMP3 Series.

After the V8SuperTourer category merged with the New Zealand V8s, the NZ Touring Car Championship was born. Evans would contend the next two championships, with performances equally as dominant as what was demonstrated in the final V8SuperTourers season. He would win 23 out of the 38 races he contended, and claim both championships before leaving the category in 2017.

In 2018, Evans joined Jaguar I-Pace eTrophy, a closed-wheel feeder series to Formula E, where his brother Mitch also races for the Jaguar team. He won his first race in Saudi Arabia, racing at the same weekend as Formula E series.

Racing record

Career summary

† As he was a guest driver, Evans was ineligible to score points.

Complete Jaguar I-Pace eTrophy results
(key) (Races in bold indicate pole position)

References

External links
 
 

1990 births
Living people
New Zealand racing drivers
Formula Ford drivers
V8SuperTourer drivers
Audi Sport TT Cup drivers
Multimatic Motorsports drivers